Raise Up the Tent is the fifth studio album by Tea Leaf Green. Released on July 22, 2008 by Surfdog Records, It was produced by Camper Van Beethoven founder and Cracker cofounder, David Lowery.

Track listing
All songs written by Trevor Garrod. 
 "Let Us Go" - 3:31
 "Don't Curse at the Night" - 4:34
 "Red Ribbons" - 4:06
 "I've Got a Truck" - 3:45
 "Innocence" - 3:58
 "Not Fit" - 4:35
 "Borrowed Time" - 3:19
 "Slept Through Sunday" - 5:30
 "Standing Still" - 4:38
 "Stick to the Shallows (Don't Drift Away)" - 3:28
 "Keeping the Faith" - 3:50

Artists
 Josh Clark - Guitar, vocals
 Reed Mathis - Bass, cello, and vocals
 Scott Rager - Drums, percussion, and backing vocals
 Trevor Garrod - Keyboards, banjo, harmonica, and vocals

Guest Artists
 Dan Lebowitz - Pedal Steel on "Stick to the Shallow"
 Aaron Redner - Violin on "Innocence"
 Sasha Butterfly Rose - Backing vocals on "Innocence" and "Standing Still"

2008 albums
Tea Leaf Green albums